
Gmina Tczów is a rural gmina (administrative district) in Zwoleń County, Masovian Voivodeship, in east-central Poland.

Villages
Gmina Tczów contains the villages and settlements of Bartodzieje, Borki, Brzezinki Nowe, Brzezinki Stare, Janów, Józefów, Julianów, Kazimierzów, Lucin, Podzakrzówek, Rawica Nowa, Rawica Stara, Rawica-Józefatka, Rawica-Kolonia, Tczów, Tynica and Wincentów.

Neighbouring gminas
Gmina Tczów is bordered by the gminas of Gózd, Kazanów, Skaryszew and Zwoleń.

References
Polish official population figures 2006

Tczow
Zwoleń County